Bnot Caesarea Tiv'on was an Israeli women's football club from Kiryat Tiv'on and Caesarea, who competed in the Israeli Second League and the Israeli Women's Cup.

History
The club was originally established in 2002 as Ironi Holon and played its home matches in Holon, before relocating to Kiryat Tiv'on at the beginning of the 2004–05 season and playing under the name Bnot Tiv'on. Before the following season, the club was renamed Bnot Caesarea Tiv'on, while continuing to play in Kiryat Tiv'on. The same season the club finished fourth in the Northern division of the league and qualified to the championship group, eventually finishing 6th, its best league position. In the following seasons the club struggled in the bottom of the league, and at the end of the 2009–10 season was relegated to the newly formed second division. However, the club failed to show to its first matches, and was thrown out of the league.

In 2012 the club was split into two teams, Bnot Tiv'on, under management from Kiryat Tiv'on, and Bnot Caesarea, under the former management, joined by footballer Shelly Israel. The two teams played in the second division, and finished 6th and 5th, respectively. At the end of the season, following a dispute between Shelly Israel and Bnot Caesarea co-owner, Ran Ben Basat, Israel quit the club, and the two club merged again to re-form Bnot Caesarea Tiv'on. The club played 8 matches in the second division and folded.

In the Israeli Women's Cup the club never won a match, except for a walkover win over Bnot Beit She'an, and never reached more than the quarter-finals. The club also played in the second division cup and reached the final in both 2012 and 2013 (as Bnot Tiv'on), and twice lost in the final.

Seasons

References

External links
 Bnot Caesarea Tiv'on Israeli Football Association 
 Bnot Caesarea Israeli Football Association 

Women's football clubs in Israel
Association football clubs established in 2002
Association football clubs disestablished in 2014
Defunct football clubs in Israel
Sport in Holon
2002 establishments in Israel